Swapna is a 1981 Telugu/Kannada film directed by Dasari Narayana Rao and produced by Jagadish Prasad. It marked the film debut of Swapna. The film's music was provided by Chellapilla Satyam. The film is a remake of the 1964 Bollywood film Sangam. Some of the songs were very well received, particularly Ide Naa Modati Premalekha and Ankitam Neeke Ankitam(Arpane Ninage Arpane in Kannada).

Cast 
 Raja
 Swapna
 Ramji
 Chatla Sriramulu

Plot
Shankar holds a great fondness for Swapna, who happens to be his childhood friend alongside Ramesh. Despite this, Swapna harbors romantic feelings towards Ramesh. Nevertheless, a sudden turn of events takes place, altering their lives in a significant way.

Soundtrack 
The soundtrack is composed by Sathyam while the lyrics were written by Rajasri and Dasari Narayana Rao.

References

External links 
 
 
 Swapna film review at Telugu cinema.com
 Sangini Entertainments

1980s Telugu-language films
1980s Kannada-language films
Films directed by Dasari Narayana Rao
Films scored by Satyam (composer)
1981 films
Indian drama films
Indian multilingual films
Kannada remakes of Hindi films
Telugu remakes of Hindi films
1981 drama films
1981 multilingual films